Miller Brothers Farm, also called Kensington and Big House is a Classical Revival style house located in Kensington, Georgia along State Route 912. Built in 1890 as a hotel, the house was added to the National Register of Historic Places in 1987.

The main house is the only surviving building of the farm.

References

1890s architecture in the United States
Neoclassical architecture in Georgia (U.S. state)
Houses on the National Register of Historic Places in Georgia (U.S. state)
Houses in Walker County, Georgia
National Register of Historic Places in Walker County, Georgia
Hotel buildings on the National Register of Historic Places in Georgia (U.S. state)